The 2002–03 season saw Grimsby Town compete in the Football League First Division where they finished in 24th position with 39 points and were relegated to the Second Division.

Transfers

Transfers In

Loans In

Transfers Out

Loans Out

Final league table

Results
Grimsby Town's score comes first

Legend

Football League First Division

FA Cup

Football League Cup

Squad statistics

References

External links
 Grimsby Town 2002–03 at Soccerbase.com (select relevant season from dropdown list)

Grimsby Town F.C. seasons
Grimsby Town